The Master of Stair is a 1907 historical novel by the British writer Marjorie Bowen. It was her second published novel after her hit debut The Viper of Milan, and was also a bestseller. The plot revolves around the 1689 Massacre of Glencoe in the wake of the Glorious Revolution. It is also known by the alternative title of The Glen o' Weeping.

References

Bibliography
 Vinson, James. Twentieth-Century Romance and Gothic Writers. Macmillan, 1982.

1907 British novels
Novels set in Scotland
British historical novels
Novels by Marjorie Bowen
Novels set in the 17th century